Insurance Institute (INSIG SH.A.) is an Albanian insurance company. Established in 1991 as a government-owned monopoly, it was the first insurance company to operate in Albania and it has played a defining role in the creation, development and consolidation of this business in the country's economy.

INSIG carries out its activities mainly in the field of insurance by the offering of life and general insurance products and services. The company has expanded its operations outside the territory of Albania by opening new subsidiaries in neighbouring Kosovo and North Macedonia.

Eurosig bought both the life and non-life insurance businesses of Insig from Albania's government for 2.2 billion leks ($17.9 million/16.3 million euro) in May 2016.

In May 2016, the Albanian Government sold the life and general insurance business of INSIG for 2.2 billion leks (17.9 million, or 16.3 million euros).

References

Financial services companies established in 1991
Insurance companies of Albania
Albanian brands
1991 establishments in Albania